Apiwat Pengprakon (born 22 August 1988) is a Thai professional footballer who plays as striker for Thai League 2 club Nakhon Si United.

External links
 

1988 births
Living people
Apiwat Pengprakon
Apiwat Pengprakon
Association football forwards
Apiwat Pengprakon
Apiwat Pengprakon
Apiwat Pengprakon
Apiwat Pengprakon
Apiwat Pengprakon
Apiwat Pengprakon
Apiwat Pengprakon
Apiwat Pengprakon
Apiwat Pengprakon
Nakhon Si United F.C. players